Arkansas Health Connector/Arkansas Private option is the health insurance marketplace, previously known as health insurance exchange, in the U.S. state of Arkansas, created in accordance with the Patient Protection and Affordable Care Act. The marketplace operates a web site and a toll-free resource center.

The marketplace is offered to individuals and families who are not covered by their employer. It allows enrollees  to compare health insurance plans and provides those who qualify  with access to tax credits. Enrollment started on October 1, 2013.

The Arkansas Exchange will be run as a State-Federal partnership where the state will be responsible for the disseminating information regarding the marketplace. Actual enrollment of consumers in Arkansas will be handled by the Federally Facilitated Marketplace at HealthCare.gov.

As of December 2013, the state of Arkansas has received over 53 million dollars for operation of the site.

Participating Insurance Providers
In 2014, 3 insurance providers will be participating in the state of Arkansas

 Ambetter of Arkansas
 Arkansas Blue Cross Blue Shield
 QualChoice Health Insurance

References

External links
Arkansas Health Connector
Medical Insurance Quotes

Arkansas
Healthcare in Arkansas
Arkansas